Mitchell Municipal Airport  is three miles north of Mitchell, in Davison County, South Dakota. The National Plan of Integrated Airport Systems for 2011–2015 categorized it as a general aviation airport.

History 
Opened in November 1937, the facility was rebuilt in 1943 by the United States Army Air Forces as a Second Air Force B-17 Flying Fortress and B-24 Liberator heavy bomber training airfield field known as Mitchell Army Airfield.

From July to late September, 1943, the 700th Bomb Squadron of the 445th Bomb Group conducted their advanced training at Mitchell Army Air Field.  Upon completion of training and subsequent notification for overseas deployment, the 700th Bomb Squadron flew to Lincoln Army Air Field for last minute aircraft modifications before taking the Southern Atlantic crossing route to Tibenham, England.

On October 1, 1944, when training ended at the facility, it was transferred to Air Technical Service Command where it was assigned to Ogden Air Service Command as an auxiliary airfield. It was turned over to civil use after the war.

Airline flights began about 1951: Midwest Airlines Cessna 190s. Braniff stopped at Mitchell 1952–59; North Central arrived in 1959 and successor Republic left in 1982. (Northwest Airlink pulled out in 1991.)

Facilities
The airport covers 1,376 acres (557 ha) at an elevation of 1,304 feet (397 m). It has two asphalt runways: 12/30 is 6,700 by 100 feet (2,042 x 30 m) and 17/35 is 5,513 by 100 feet (1,680 x 30 m).

In the year ending August 10, 2011 the airport had 19,450 aircraft operations, average 53 per day: 95% general aviation, 4% air taxi, and 1% military. 29 aircraft were then based at this airport: 79% single-engine and 21% multi-engine.

See also 

 South Dakota World War II Army Airfields

References 

 
 Shaw, Frederick J. (2004), Locating Air Force Base Sites History's Legacy, Air Force History and Museums Program, United States Air Force, Washington DC, 2004.

External links 
 Aerial image as of October 1997 from USGS The National Map
 

Airports in South Dakota
Mitchell, South Dakota
Buildings and structures in Davison County, South Dakota
Airfields of the United States Army Air Forces in South Dakota
1937 establishments in South Dakota
Airports established in 1937
Transportation in Davison County, South Dakota